Margaret Finlay is a former three-term mayor of Duarte, California.

Finlay, currently serving on the Duarte City Council, graduated from St. Mary's College in Notre Dame, Indiana, earning a bachelor's degree in marketing, and received her master's degree in public administration from Cal State Long Beach in 2000. Finlay has a lot of experience outside the Duarte City Council, such as being elected Los Angeles County LAFCO Commissioner in 2005, 14 years as member of the San Gabriel Valley Vector Control District, including two years as president of the district, nine years as part of the executive committee of the California Joint Powers Insurance Authority, two years as a member of the board of directors of the National League of Cities, four years as a member of the state board of directors of the League of California Cities, eight years as part of the legislative hair of the L.A. County Library Commission, president of the California Contract Cities Association in 2004–2005, member of the L.A. County Sheriff's Liability Trust Fund Board, and ten years as the board of directors and personnel committee of the Los Angeles County Sanitation District.

References

External links
 

Living people
Mayors of places in California
Women mayors of places in California
People from Duarte, California
Year of birth missing (living people)
21st-century American women